The Moridae are a family of cod-like fishes, known as codlings, hakelings, and moras.

In appearance, they greatly resemble the typical cods, from which can only be distinguished by their skeletal features and the structure of the swim bladder.

References

 

 
Ray-finned fish families